UDP-N-acetyl-D-mannosamine dehydrogenase (UDP-ManNAc 6-dehydrogenase, wecC (gene)) is an enzyme with systematic name UDP-N-acetyl-alpha-D-mannosamine:NAD+ 6-oxidoreductase. This enzyme catalyses the following chemical reaction

 UDP-N-acetyl-alpha-D-mannosamine + 2 NAD+ + H2O  UDP-N-acetyl-alpha-D-mannosaminuronate + 2 NADH + 2 H+

This enzyme participates in acetamido sugar biosynthesis in bacteria and archaea.

References

External links 
 

EC 1.1.1